Zatch Bell! Mamodo Battles, known as Konjiki no Gash Bell!! Yuujou Tag Battle 2!! in Japan, is a video game that was released in 2005 by Bandai.  Based on the Zatch Bell! anime and manga series by Makoto Raiku, it is a 3D fighting game.

Story
Every one thousand years, one hundred mamodo descend upon the earth to fight the ultimate battle. The winning mamodo becomes the mighty king of the mamodo world. There is only one problem - in order for the mamodo to use their powerful spell books, they need a human partner.

The game depicts the storyline of the manga and anime just prior to the Ancient Mamodo arc.

Game modes
There is a story mode where the player can choose one of six characters to use and play through a unique campaign for each character. The game also has a time attack mode that scores the player after battling eight opponents, and a practice mode that allows the player to train against a dummy opponent.

As the player progresses and spends time in the game, they earn points that can be used to unlock upgraded characters. Points can also be used to purchase unlockable cards.

Reception

Reviews have generally been mixed. The game was criticized for being too simple and appealing only to fans of the anime. The single-player game was considered too easy and too short. However its cel-shaded art was praised for quality.

References

2005 video games
Eighting games
Bandai games
GameCube games
PlayStation 2 games
Zatch Bell! video games
Multiplayer and single-player video games
RenderWare games
Cartoon Network video games
Video games developed in Japan
Video games scored by Shinji Hosoe
Video games scored by Yousuke Yasui